Jonathan T. Leo is a former Professor of Anatomy at Lincoln Memorial University in Harrogate, Tennessee. He is currently an Associate Professor of Anatomy at the Alabama College of Osteopathic Medicine. He has published articles critical of chemical and biological theories of mental illness. He is the former editor-in-chief of Ethical Human Psychology and Psychiatry. With Sami Timimi, he is also the co-editor of the book Rethinking ADHD.

JAMA controversy
In 2008, Leo and Jeffrey Lacasse co-authored a letter to the editor that was published in JAMA. The letter criticized a randomized controlled trial that had been published in JAMA aimed at determining the effectiveness of the antidepressant drug escitalopram in the treatment of stroke. Leo and Lacasse criticized the original trial for not directly comparing the effectiveness of escitalopram with that of problem-solving therapy. After this letter was published, Leo discovered through a Google search that one of the authors of the escitalopram paper, psychiatrist Robert Robinson, had received speaking fees from Forest Laboratories, the company that produces and sells the drug under the name Lexapro. Robinson had not disclosed this conflict of interest in the paper. Five months later, Leo and Lacasse published a letter on the website of the BMJ pointing out this conflict of interest.

References

External links
Faculty page

Living people
Lincoln Memorial University faculty
Macalester College alumni
University of Iowa alumni
American anatomists
Academic journal editors
Year of birth missing (living people)